Victor G. Garcia III, KCR is the Ambassador Extraordinary and Plenipotentiary of the Republic of the Philippines to the Russian Federation. Garcia also served as Philippine Ambassador to Austria, Croatia, Slovenia and Bosnia-Herzegovina and Resident & Permanent Representative to the International Organizations in Vienna. From December 12-15, 2000, Garcia was the Chairman of the Philippine delegation and chief  Signatory to the UN Convention Against Transnational Organized Crime and the Protocols Related Thereto in Palermo, Italy.

Honors and awards 
 : Knight Commander of Rizal (KCR) of the Order of the Knights of Rizal - (1993).
 Distinguished Service Award given by the Philippine Secretary of Foreign Affairs, Domingo L. Siazon Jr., for Outstanding and Dedicated Services (2000).

References 

Filipino diplomats
Year of birth missing (living people)
Living people
Ambassadors of the Philippines to Russia